Wilshire Park is a  public park in northeast Portland, Oregon, United States. Situated within the Beaumont-Wilshire neighborhood, the park was acquired by the city in 1940, and is maintained by Portland Parks & Recreation. The park features a variety of facilities and uses including playgrounds, an off-leash dog park, baseball fields, picnic tables, and a 0.6 mile loop trail.

See also
 List of parks in Portland, Oregon

References

External links

 Friends of Wilshire Park

Beaumont-Wilshire, Portland, Oregon
Parks in Portland, Oregon